
Gmina Grębocice is a rural gmina (administrative district) in Polkowice County, Lower Silesian Voivodeship, in south-western Poland.

Neighbouring gminas
Gmina Grębocice is bordered by the gminas of Głogów, Jerzmanowa, Pęcław, Polkowice and Rudna.

Villages
The gmina contains the villages of Bucze, Duża Wólka, Grębocice, Grodowiec, Grodziszcze, Krzydłowice, Kwielice, Obiszów, Ogorzelec, Proszyce, Retków, Rzeczyca, Stara Rzeka, Szymocin, Trzęsów, Wilczyn and Żabice.

References

Grebocice
Polkowice County